Kovambo Theopoldine Katjimune Nujoma (née Mushimba; born 10 March 1933 in Windhoek) is a Namibian political figure and former First Lady of Namibia. 

Nujoma, who is the wife of former president Sam Nujoma, served as the inaugural First Lady of Namibia for fifteen years from the country's creation in 1990 until 2005. She has been nicknamed the "Mother of the Nation."

Biography 
Nujoma was born in Windhoek on 10 March 1933, the daughter of Johannes and Kandorera Mushimba. Nujoma's siblings included Aaron Mushimba, a businessman and SWAPO pro-independence figure.

She married Sam Nujoma on 6 May 1956. The couple had three sons and one daughter; Utoni Daniel (born 1952), John Ndeshipanda (1955–1993), Sakaria "Zacky" Nujoma (born 1957), and Nelago Nujoma (born 1959), who died at 18 months while her husband was in exile.

Kovambo Nujoma became the inaugural First Lady of Namibia upon the country's establishment on March 21, 1990. She served as First Lady for three terms, until President Sam Nujoma retired from office on March 21, 2005.

Awards
Kovambo Nujoma was conferred the Most Brilliant Order of the Sun, First Class on Heroes' Day in 2014.

Recognitions 
Nujoma was named after a street in Walvisbay, "Kovambo Nujoma Drive" which is located in the southwest of that town. Kovambo Nujoma was named after a community Hall in windhoek, Khomas known as "Kovambo Nujoma Community Hall".

National Liberation 
Nujoma was put under house arrest together with her brother, Aaron Mushimba, in 1960. She was accused when her husband left to Angola in 1960, to have decided to join him in 1980s in Angola, for that reason she was approached by the South African Security forces for her to persuade her to her husband Sam Nujoma.

References

Living people 
1931 births
First ladies of Namibia
SWAPO politicians
20th-century Namibian politicians
21st-century Namibian politicians
Politicians from Windhoek